Pyali is a 2022 Malayalam-language drama film written and directed by couple duo directors Babitha Mathew and Rinn A X produced by Sofia Varghese, daughter of late Malayalam actor NF Varghese, under the banner NF Varghese Pictures and Dulquer Salmaan's Wayfarer films.

The lead roles are played by child artists Barbiee Sharma and George Jacob. The film also features veteran actors Sreenivasan and Mamukkoya, along with Rafi, Appani Sarath, Sujith Shankar and Aadukalam Murugadoss in pivotal roles.

The writing of the story began back in the latter part of 2015 and has been in the works since then after finding a producer in 2018. The film was shot in parts of Ernakulam, Fort Kochi and Vathuruthy Colony in July and November 2019.

Prashant Pillai has composed four songs for the film in Hindi and English, and there are plans to include a Malayalam song as well. The crew includes editor Deepu Joseph, art director Santhosh Raman, sound designer Renganaath Ravee.

The film was released on 8 July 2022.

Plot 
The story revolves around the bond between a sister and brother. Barbiee plays the titular five-year-old, while Jacob plays her 14-year-old brother named Ziyah.

Kashmiri-origin siblings are orphans who live in a slum in Kerala. Despite facing many difficulties, Ziyah makes sure to do his best by his little sister. The story is about the siblings overcoming hurdles to fulfill their little desires.

Cast 
 Aravya Sharma as Pyali
 George Jacob as Ziyah
 Sreenivasan as Zayed
 Mamukkoya as Nicholan
 Rafi
 Appani Sarath
 Sujith Shankar
 Aadukalam Murugadoss
 Unni Mukundan as Miska Saha Salman (Cameo appearance)
 Karthik Vishnu

Production 
Barbiee has previously acted in Hindi films like Baaghi 2 and Bharat as well as television serials. Jacob was selected after auditioning hundreds of kids. They were very specific about the appearance of both children as the characters are of Kashmiri origin. Jacob was born and brought up in Dubai. Since everything about Kerala and the language was new to him, we trained him for two days on the dialect, the body language of a slum kid, and much more. Barbiee having previous experience, only needed to be taught the Malayalam dialogues.

Babitha and Rinn were previously working as an IT professional and an interior designer, respectively, before entering the film industry a few years ago. Pyali marks their feature directorial debut.

Accolades

References 

2020s Malayalam-language films
Indian drama films
2022 drama films
2022 films